The National Union of Eritrean Youth and Students (NUEYS) is dedicated to improving the skills and awareness of Eritrean youth. The organization seeks to strengthen and improve the youth in all aspects on the regional, national and international levels.

NUEYS has branches throughout Eritrea as well as the world to serve the Diaspora.

External links
NUEYS official site

World Federation of Democratic Youth
Youth in Eritrea
Youth organizations established in 1978